Alex Díaz (born January 13, 1989) is a Colombian football defender who currently plays for Millonarios FC in the Categoría Primera A. Díaz is a product of the Millonarios youth system and played with the Millonarios first team since July, 2007.He is a starter on Millonarios who reached the Semi-finals of the Copa Sudamericana 2007
.
After a short term at America de Cali in 2012, he returns to Millonarios for the second half of the year.

Statistics (Official games/Colombian Ligue and Colombian Cup)
(As of November 14, 2010)

References

External links

1989 births
Living people
Colombian footballers
Colombia under-20 international footballers
Categoría Primera A players
Categoría Primera B players
Millonarios F.C. players
América de Cali footballers
Deportivo Pasto footballers
La Equidad footballers
Association football defenders
Sportspeople from Chocó Department